(French for "blue, white and red") may refer to:

 The Flag of France, whose colors are given as "bleu, blanc et rouge"
 Montreal Bleu Blanc Rouge, a junior ice hockey team
 A common nickname for the professional ice hockey team Montreal Canadiens
 Blue, White and Red Rally (Rassemblement Bleu Blanc Rouge) a nationalist political association in France
 The Three Colors trilogy films
 Bleu-Blanc-Rouge, a 1998 novel by Alain Mabanckou

See also
 Red White and Blue (disambiguation)